Vladimir Vladimirovich Yeryomkin (born 23 January 1988) is a former Russian professional football player.

Club career
He played two seasons in the Russian Football National League for FC Torpedo Moscow.

External links
 
 Career summary by sportbox.ru

1988 births
Sportspeople from Tomsk
Living people
Russian footballers
Association football midfielders
FC Torpedo Moscow players